Harcourt Dowsley (15 July 1919 – 30 October 2014) was an Australian sportsman who played first-class cricket with the Victorian cricket team and Australian rules football for Carlton in the Victorian Football League (VFL).

He was born in Essendon, Victoria, the grandson of William Dowsley, a farmer from St Arnaud, Victoria, and Emily Dowsley née Donnelly. Harcourt Dowsley's parents were Allan Harcourt Dowsley and Kathleen Olive Dowsley née Gaetz. A brother, William Allan Dowsley, predeceased him in March 2014.

Dowsley made his first-class debut in a match against Tasmania at the Melbourne Cricket Ground in 1937/38 when he opened the batting and made scores of 46 and 72 not out. Tasmania would be Dowsley's opponent in all of his five first-class matches, the first three coming before his VFL stint and the other two after.

An Old Melburnian, Dowsley played his football as a full-forward and kicked four goals on debut in the 1941 VFL season, against St Kilda at Junction Oval. He kept his spot in the side for the next couple of games, kicking a further three goals, before joining the RAAF with whom he would serve in the World War II Pacific campaign as a Catalina pilot with the rank of pilot officer. When Dowsley returned from war he turned his attention to cricket and in 1946 played two first-class matches to finish his career with 336 runs at 56.00, including three half centuries. He also took two wickets at 37.00 with his right-arm fast-medium bowling.

He died in October 2014, aged 95.

See also
 List of Victoria first-class cricketers

References

External links

Cricinfo: Harcourt Dowsley

1919 births
2014 deaths
Australian cricketers
Victoria cricketers
Australian rules footballers from Melbourne
Carlton Football Club players
Melbourne Cricket Club cricketers
Old Melburnians Football Club players
Cricketers from Melbourne
Royal Australian Air Force personnel of World War II
Royal Australian Air Force officers
Australian World War II pilots
People from Essendon, Victoria
Military personnel from Melbourne